Horus Heresy may refer to:

The Horus Heresy, a series of novels set in the Warhammer 40,000 setting and published by Black Library
Horus Heresy (card game)
Horus Heresy (2010 board game)
Horus Heresy (1993 board game)
The assertion that Jesus is in part based on Horus, in Christ myth theory